Georgia Inglis (born 28 March 1994) is a 2.5 point Australian wheelchair basketball player.  She was part of the Australia women's national wheelchair basketball team at the Osaka Cup in Japan in February 2013, and at the Asia-Oceania Zone Qualifiers in Bangkok in November 2013. She played with the Perth Western Stars team that won the Women's National Wheelchair basketball League (WNWBL) championship title in 2013.

Personal
Georgia Inglis was born on 28 March 1994. In 2004, she was run over by a ride-on lawn mower, resulting in a broken back. She graduated from Curtin University in 2017 with a Bachelor in health science. She is currently enrolled at the University of Alabama completing her master's degree in Women's Studies. Her sister Maddison Inglis is a professional tennis player.

Wheelchair basketball

Club

Inglis made her debut with the Perth Western Stars in 2010. In 2013, she was part of the side that won the Women's National Wheelchair Basketball League (WNWBL) championship title. The Stars fought their way back from nine points down at three quarter time to win 43–40, in part due her efforts. "Georgia Inglis", wrote one commentator, "was outstanding in the clutch hitting some BIG baskets which including a one handed buzzer beater that tied the scores up."

Inglis played with the Red Dust Lady Heelers in its debut season in 2017, averaging nine points, five rebounds and 4.9 assists per game.   She returned to the Western Stars (now: Perth Wheelcats) in 2018.

College
In April 2018, the University of Alabama announced that it had signed Inglis to play with the Alabama Crimson Tide. In her first year at Alabama, Inglis won her first Collegiate National Championship after defeating the University of Texas at Arlington.

National
Inglis made her international debut playing for the Under 25 team in the Under 25 Women's Wheelchair Basketball World Championships in Canada in 2011, winning a silver medal. She made her debut with the senior team, known as the Gliders, at the Osaka Cup in Japan in February 2013, where the Gliders successfully defended the trophy they had won in 2008, 2009, 2010 and 2012. In October 2013, she was selected to play at the International Wheelchair Basketball Federation (IWBF) Asia/Oceania Championships in Thailand in November 2013.

She was a member of the Australian team that won the silver medal in the 3x3 Women's tournament at the 2022 Commonwealth Games.

References

1994 births
Living people
Australian women's wheelchair basketball players
Commonwealth Games silver medallists for Australia
Commonwealth Games medallists in basketball
People with paraplegia
20th-century Australian women
21st-century Australian women
Medallists at the 2022 Commonwealth Games